Fountain Hill Historic District is a national historic district located at Bethlehem, Lehigh County and Northampton County, Pennsylvania. Despite the name, it is mostly excludes the borough of Fountain Hill, which is an independent municipality located mostly to the southwest of the district. The district includes 44 contributing buildings and 1 contributing structure.  The buildings include elaborate, architecturally distinctive mansions, smaller managers' and merchants' dwellings, and public church buildings.  The mansions are the focus of the district and include the Linderman / Schwab Mansion (c. 1870), Robert Sayre House (c. 1857), and Elisha Packer Wilbur Mansion (c. 1863).  Notable non-residential buildings include the Masonic Temple and Nativity Episcopal Cathedral (c. 1866). The Hill to Hill Bridge is also included in the district.  Located in the district is the separately listed Lehigh Valley Railroad Headquarters Building.

It was added to the National Register of Historic Places in 1988.

Gallery

References

Bethlehem, Pennsylvania
Historic districts in Northampton County, Pennsylvania
Historic districts in Lehigh County, Pennsylvania
Historic districts on the National Register of Historic Places in Pennsylvania
National Register of Historic Places in Lehigh County, Pennsylvania